Sarah Leonard (born 10 April 1953) is an English classical soprano, known for her performances of contemporary classical music by composers such as Helmut Lachenmann, Harrison Birtwistle, Pierre Boulez and Michael Nyman.

Leonard was born in Winchester, and studied at the Guildhall School of Music and Drama, after which she joined the BBC Singers and the Endymion Ensemble. She made her debut at La Scala, Milan, in 1989 in the premiere of Dr Faustus by Giacomo Manzoni.

Sarah Leonard teaches at the Central School of Speech and Drama and Fitzwilliam College, Cambridge. She is a member of the Association of Teachers of Singing, the British Voice Association and is Chairman of the Association of English Singers and Speakers.

In January 2013, she was made an Honorary Doctor of Music at the University of Hull.

She sang the theme tune to Silent Witness called ‘Silencium’ by composer John Harle and on the 2014 album, The Tyburn Tree (Dark London), by John Harle and Marc Almond.

References

1953 births
Living people
Alumni of the Guildhall School of Music and Drama
Fellows of Fitzwilliam College, Cambridge
English women singers
English opera singers
Musicians from Winchester